National Academy for Primary Education is a Bangladesh Government academy responsible for providing training to government primary school teachers and is located in Mymensingh, Bangladesh. It is one of 25 key government administration training institutions.

History
National Academy for Primary Education was established in 1978 as the Academy for Fundamental Education. It was renamed in 1985 as the National Academy for Primary Education. It is under the Ministry of Primary and Mass Education. The director general of the National Academy of Primary Education, Fazlur Rahman, was killed in road crash on 13 May 2017.

References

Education in Mymensingh
Educational institutions established in 1978
1978 establishments in Bangladesh
Organisations based in Mymensingh